Jasser Auda (Cairo, November 1966) is a scholar and distinguished professor of Islamic law, in particular, the study of the higher purposes or maqasid of the Sharia. He is the President of Maqasid Institute Global, which is a think tank registered in the United States, United Kingdom, Malaysia and Indonesia, and has educational and research programs in a number of countries.

About
He is a member of the Fiqh Council of North America, the European Council for Fatwa and Research, and a fellow at the Fiqh Academy of India. He has a PhD in the philosophy of Islamic law from the University of Wales, UK, and a PhD in systems analysis from the University of Waterloo, Canada. Early in his life, he memorized the Quran and studied at the Study Circles of Al-Azhar Mosque in Cairo, Egypt. He worked previously as a professor at University of Waterloo, Carleton University    and Ryerson University in Canada, Alexandria University in Egypt, Islamic University in Sanjaq, Qatar Faculty of Islamic Studies, American University of Sharjah in the UAE and University of Bahrain. He lectured on Islam and its law in dozens of countries. He currently spearheads the Masters in Applied Islamic Thought Programme at the International Peace College in South Africa which he also founded in 2020. He has also been lecturing in the Honours programme at the same institute based in Cape Town.
He wrote 25 books in Arabic and English, some of which were translated to 25 languages.

Previous academic positions
 Visiting Professor, International Peace College South Africa (IPSA), Cape Town, South Africa. 2016 – Present 
 Visiting Professor, Center for the Study of Islam, Carleton University, Ottawa, Canada. 2015 – 2016 
 Professor of Islamic Law, Qatar Faculty of Islamic Studies, Qatar.  2013 – 2015
 Professor of Sharia Law, Islamic University of Novi Pazar, Serbia. 2013 – 2014 
 Associate Professor, Qatar Faculty of Islamic Studies, Qatar. 2010 – 2012
 Founding Deputy Director, Center for Islamic Legislation and Ethics, Qatar Foundation, Qatar. 2011 – 2012: 
 Founding Director, Research Centre in the Philosophy of Islamic Law, Al-Furqan Islamic Heritage Foundation, U.K. 2005 – 2009:
 Associate Professor of Islamic Law, Faculty of Law, Alexandria University, Alexandria, Egypt. 2007 – 2009:
 Expert, UK Board of Muslim Scholars, Ministry of Communities and University of Cambridge, UK. 2008 – 2009:
 Associate Professor of Arts and Sciences, American University of Sharjah, UAE. 2001 – 2005: 
 Research/Adjunct Assistant Professor, Department of Systems Analysis, University of Waterloo, Canada. 1996 – 2001: 
 Research/Teaching Assistant, Department of Systems Analysis, University of Waterloo, Canada. 1993 – 1996: 
 Researcher, Systems Department, National Research Center, Egypt. 1988 – 1992

Publication

Books 
 Tarteeb al-‘Aql al-Muslim: Muraja’at fi daw’ al-sunan al-ilahiyyah wal-maqasid al-shar’iyyah (Reorganizing the Muslim Mind: Reflections in Light of Divine Universal Laws and Shariah Objectives). Al-Shabakah Al-Arabiyah, Beirut, 2017 (upcoming).
 Maqāsid al-Sharī`ah as Philosophy of Islamic Law: A Systems Approach, International Institute of Islamic Thought, London-Washington, several reprints: 2008-14. Translated to Arabic, Bosnian, Italian, Turkish, Malaysian and Indonesian. Various publishers: 2010-15.
 Maqāsid al-Sharī`ah: A Beginner’s Guide. London: International Institute of Islamic Thought (IIIT), many reprints, 2008-2016. Translated to: Arabic, Urdu, German, Indonesian, Malaysian, Russian, Azeri, Tamil, Bengali, Turkish, Japanese, Kurdish, Malayalam, French, Bosnian, Italian, Somali, Uzbek, Greek, Spanish, Korean, Thai, Somali, Amharic. Various publishers: 2009-16.
 Al-Dawlah al-Madaniyya: Nahwa tajawuz al-istibdad wa tahqeeq maqasid al-shariah (Civil State: Towards overcoming authoritarianism & realizing maqasid al-shariah), Al-Shabakah Al-Arabiyah, Beirut, 2015. Translated to: English, Italian, Malayalam, Bengali, & Malaysian.
 Al-Mar’ah fil-Masjid: Dawruha wa Makanatuha (Women in the Mosque: Their Role and Contribution), Dar Makased, Cairo 2015. Trans. to English, Indonesian, Bengali, Malaysian.
 Bayn al-shariah wal-siyasah: As’ilah li-marhalat ma ba’d al-thawraat (Between Shariah and Politics: Questions in the Post-Revolutions era). Beirut: Al-Shabakah Al-Arabiyyah, 2012, 2013. Translated to: Farsi, Malaysian, and Malayalam. Various publishers: 2013-2015.
 Al-Ijtihad al-maqasidi: Majmou’at buhouth (Purposeful Reasoning: Selected Papers). Beirut: Al-Shabakah Al-Arabiyyah, 2013, 2014. Translated to Urdu, Farsi and Tamil.
 Al-Sulouk ma’-Allah: Rihlah ma’a hikam Ibn Ataa-ellah fi daw’ al-kitab wal-sunnah wal-sunan al-ilahiyyah (Ethics with God: A Journey with Ibn Ataa-Ellah in light of the Quran, Sunnah, and Universal Laws). Cairo: Darul-Hidaiah, 2010. Translated to: English, Bosnian, Indonesian, Malaysian, Italian and Urdu, Various publishers: 2011-2015.
 Khulasat Bidāyat al-Mujtahid libni-Rushd (Averröes’s Premier of the Jurist: Synopsis and Commentary), India: Noor Foundation, 2006, 2007, and Cairo: Al-Shurouq, 2010.
 Fiqh al-Maqāsid: Inātat al-ahkām al-shar`īah bimaqāsidihā (Teleological Jurisprudence: Basing Islamic Rulings on their Purposes), International Institute of Islamic Thought, Virginia, 2006, 2007, 2008. Translated to: Urdu and Azeri, 2010.

Journal articles 
 "Shariah, Ethical Goals and the Modern Society", MUIS – Islamic Religious Council of Singapore Academy Series, No. 10, Singapore, 2016.
 "Al-Ijtihad al-maqasidi: Ru’ya Manzumiyyah" (Ijtihad via Maqasid: A Systems Approach), Al-Muslim Al-Mu’asir Journal, Cairo, 2014.
 "Kayf nuhadid al-‘alaqah bayn al-dini wal-madani" (How do we Define the Relationship between the Religious and the Secular?), Al-Ihyaa Journal, Mohammadan Council of Scholars, Morocco, Article No. 5771, Sept. 2013.
 "Qira’ah fi utrouhat al-doctoura lil-marhoum Ismail al-Faruqi: hawla ithbat al-khair" (A Critical Reading of Ismail al-Faruqi's PhD Thesis: On Justifying the Good), Islamization of Knowledge Journal, International Institute of Islamic Thought, Virginia, Fall 2013.
 "Tawzeef maqasid al-shariah fi tarsheed syasaat al-iqtisad al-ma’rifi" (Utilizing Maqasid al-Shariah towards improving knowledge economy policies), Islamization of Knowledge Journal, International Institute of Islamic Thought, Fall 2012.
 "An Outline of the Islamic Maqasidi/Purpose-Based Approach". Q-Science Journal, Islamic Bioethics: The Interplay of Islam and the West, Bloomsbury, 2012 Volume.
 "Al-Ijtihad al-maqasidi" (Ijtihad via Maqasid), Islamiyyat Al-Ma’rifah Journal, International Institute of Islamic Thought, Spring 2012.
 "A Maqasidi Approach to Contemporary Application of the Shariah", Intellectual Discourse Journal, Islamic University of Malaysia, Vol. 19, No 3, Malaysia, 2011.
 "Basing the Juridical Rules on their Purposes", Tajdeed Journal, Islamic University of Malaysia, Issue 19, Year 10, Malaysia, 2006.
 "Abrogation of Rulings: A Critique", Intellectual Discourse Journal, Islamic University of Malaysia, Vol. 12, No 2, Malaysia, 2004.

References

External links 
 International Peace College South Africa
 https://www.cilecenter.org/en/activities/arts-and-politics-from-an-ethical-perspective/users/ Arts and Politics from an Ethical Perspective

Year of birth missing (living people)
Living people
Muslim scholars of Islamic jurisprudence